Rijnsburg is a village in the eastern part of the municipality of Katwijk, in the western Netherlands, in the province of South Holland. The name means Rhine's Burg in Dutch.

History
The history starts way before the 2th century when there was a castle called " castle on the rhine". The king who ruled was called William 1 Count of Holland. But he was also the king over Germany.

His grandson was called Floris VI and was also count of Holland. 

Rijnsburg used to be a separated municipality until 1 January 2006, when, together with Valkenburg, it was added to the municipality of Katwijk.

Rijnsburg's main claim to fame is that the philosopher Spinoza lived there from 1661 to 1663. The modest house in which he lived is still preserved, and can be visited.

Rijnsburg is located in an area called the "Dune and Bulb district" (Duin- en Bollenstreek) and is one of the locations of the flower auction company Royal FloraHolland.

Rijnsburg Abbey was established by Petronilla of Lorraine, consort of Floris II, Count of Holland, in 1133. It flourished for many years. Two of her granddaughters, Sophie and Hedwig, would later join this abbey, one of them as abbess.

Archeological finds 
In 1913 a buckle, the mount with red, white and blue enamel, and the square coin were found together in a cemetery at Rijnsburg. The impressive gilded buckle with interwoven filigree and enamel inlay was probably made in Kent (England) across the Channel. These finds amongst others indicate that the mouth of the Rhine was home to some people of very high status, perhaps even royalty.

Burials at Rijnsburg Abbey
 Floris the Black
 Petronilla of Lorraine
 Dirk VI, Count of Holland
 William I, Count of Holland
 Floris IV, Count of Holland

Gallery

References

Katwijk
Populated places in South Holland
Former municipalities of South Holland
Municipalities of the Netherlands disestablished in 2006